José Antonio "Tony" Alfaro Vázquez (born 15 June 1993) is a Mexican professional footballer who plays as a defender for Major League Soccer club New York City FC.

Early career
Alfaro spent his entire college career at California State University, Dominguez Hills.  He made a total of 75 appearances for the Toros and tallied 10 goals and six assists.

He also played in the Premier Development League for Ventura County Fusion.

Professional career

Seattle Sounders FC 
On 14 January 2016, Alfaro was selected in the second round (27th overall) of the 2016 MLS SuperDraft by Seattle Sounders FC.  He signed a professional contract with the club two months later.

On 25 March 2016, Alfaro made his professional debut for USL affiliate club Seattle Sounders FC 2 in a match against Sacramento Republic and conceded a penalty in the 62nd minute.  Sacramento would convert their PK and win 1–0.

On 28 May 2016, Alfaro made his first-team debut for Seattle Sounders FC as a substitute for injured captain Brad Evans in the team's 1–2 loss against the New England Revolution.

On 4 March 2018, Alfaro received a red card in the 83rd minute, as the Sounders lost its opening game of the 2018 season 1–0 to recent expansion team Los Angeles FC.

Guadalajara 
In December 2018,  Alfaro passed a trial with C.D. Guadalajara and was signed as a free agent. He spent time on loan with Zacatepec in 2019.

Reno 1868 
On 31 January 2020, Alfaro signed with USL Championship side Reno 1868 FC. Reno folded their team on November 6, 2020, due to the financial impact of the COVID-19 pandemic.

D.C. United 
On 16 April 2021, Alfaro returned to Major League Soccer, signing with D.C. United. The next day, Alfaro debuted for the team in the 2–1 win over New York City FC. Alfaro scored his first MLS career goal on 1 May 2021, in a 1–4 loss against the San Jose Earthquakes. Following the 2022 season, his contract option was declined by D.C. United.

New York City FC 
On 22 December 2022, Alfaro signed a contract through 2023, with an option to extend for the 2024 Major League Soccer season with New York City FC.

Honours
Seattle Sounders FC
MLS Cup: 2016

References

External links

Cal State Dominguez Hills Toros bio

1993 births
Living people
American soccer players
Association football defenders
Cal State Dominguez Hills Toros men's soccer players
D.C. United players
Footballers from Michoacán
Mexican footballers
C.D. Guadalajara footballers
Major League Soccer players
Mexican emigrants to the United States
Mexican expatriate footballers
New York City FC players
Reno 1868 FC players
Seattle Sounders FC draft picks
Seattle Sounders FC players
Tacoma Defiance players
Sportspeople from Santa Barbara, California
Soccer players from California
USL Championship players
USL League Two players
Ventura County Fusion players